Gadiara is a village in the Howrah District of West Bengal, India. It is the point of confluence of the Rupnarayan and the Hoogli river.

Details
Gadiara is near 100 km from Kolkata. Gadiara is a popular picnic and daytrip spot for locals and tourists alike. Gadiara has an old fort, Fort Mornington, which was built by Lord Clive; it was heavily damaged during flooding in 1942. There is a lighthouse in Gadiara. Top 10 picnic spot of Howrah District. Here having a Govt Tourist Lodge named Rupnarayan Tourist Lodge. Its scenic beauty is really to be praised. It is a quiet, peaceful place. It is full of greenerya and there are swings in resorts.

External links
 
 Birding at Gadiara, Howrah

References

Villages in Howrah district
Tourist attractions in Howrah district